Mallotus nudiflorus (syn. Trevia nudiflora), the false white teak, is a species of flowering plant in the family Euphorbiaceae. It is native to the Indian Subcontinent, southern China, Southeast Asia, western Indonesia, and the Philippines.

References

nudiflorus
Plants described in 2007